Hans Dieter Aigner (born 1958 in Linz) is an Austrian artist and writer.

Biography 
Hans Dieter Aigner studied at the Academy of Pedagogy. Since 1985, he is working as an artist and participates at exhibitions. In 1991 he started writing. In 1993, he was awarded the literature prize Linzer-City-Ring in Austria. In the same year and in 2000 he received a subsidy for literature from the province of Upper Austria, and in 2002 he received a subsidy for residence in Český Krumlov in the Czech Republic. Aigner writes narrative fiction and poetry.

Works 
Gegenüber, Arovell Verlag, Gosau 2004
Sekuloff reist, Edition Pro Mente, Linz 2002
... von einem, der auszog ..., stories, Edition Pro Mente, Linz 1999

External links 
 
About a book presentation in the Stifterhaus in Linz 

Austrian male poets
1958 births
Living people
Artists from Linz
Writers from Linz